Norman Wyatt Yeo (21 June 1886 – 1 June 1950) was an Australian rules footballer who played with Essendon and University in the Victorian Football League.

Family
The son of Rev. Henry Yeo (1859–1940), and Sarah Ann Yeo (1858–1936), nee Allan , Norman Wyatt Yeo was born at Ballarat East on 21 June 1886.

He married Eva Agnes Thompson (1891-1975) on 29 October 1914.

Education
He was educated at Wesley College, Melbourne where he was a member of their first XVIII football team.

Football

Essendon (VFL)
Yeo was the leading goalkicker for Essendon in his only season with the club, scoring 31 goals in his 15 games. According to Maplestone (1996), "Yeo had business commitments that kept him out of football (in 1907]" (p.69).

VFL Representative team
Yeo was selected in the VFL side to play against a combined Ballarat team, in Ballarat, on Saturday, 11 August 1906. It was a "return" match; the first having been played in Melbourne, on the MCG, on 23 June 1906.

Given that Melbourne, St Kilda, Carlton, and Fitzroy were playing against each other in the second half of the split-round 13, selection was made from the remaining four VFL teams  although, because the entire Collingwood team were touring Tasmania (and no Collingwood players were available for selection) the team was restricted to players from Essendon, Geelong, and South Melbourne  and Yeo was one of the six Essendon players selected: Allan Belcher, Ernie Cameron, Mick Madden, Jack McKenzie, Bill Sewart, and Norman Yeo.

The combined Ballarat team outclassed the VFL side, eventually winning the match 11.7 (73) to 6.7 (43); and, although selected at full-forward, Yeo failed to score a goal.

Beverley (MJFA)
He subsequently played for Beverley in the Metropolitan Junior Football Association (MJFA), captaining the side in 1908.

University (VFL)
In 1909 Yeo again returned to senior football ranks, this time playing two games for University in the Victorian Football League.

Beverley (MJFA)
Yeo returned to the Beverley Football Club and he captained them until he retired at the end of the 1913 season.

Later life
After his football career, Yeo was a leading figure in the Australian wool industry, being the chief accountant of the Central Wool Committee
during World War I and the British Australian Wool Realization Commission which was set up to deal with the disposal of wool stocks when the war ended. He also helped the Government in its operation of the Central Wool Committee during World War II.

Death
Norman Wyatt Yeo died at his home in East Malvern on 1 June 1950, and is buried at Springvale Botanical Cemetery.

Notes

Footnotes

References
 Holmesby, Russell & Main, Jim (2014), The Encyclopedia of AFL Footballers: every AFL/VFL player since 1897 (10th ed.), Melbourne, Victoria: Bas Publishing. 
 Maplestone, M., Flying Higher: History of the Essendon Football Club 1872–1996, Essendon Football Club, (Melbourne), 1996.

External links
 
 

1886 births
1950 deaths
Australian rules footballers from Victoria (Australia)
Essendon Football Club players
University Football Club players
People educated at Wesley College (Victoria)